Rodirlei "Rodi" José Ascensão Duarte, sometime known as "Rody" (born 28 May 1991) is a Cape Verdean footballer who currently plays for  Sporting Clube da Praia, his second club based in his home country, he was previously playing for Poli Timişoara in Romania in the previous season.

Biography
Rodi spend his youth career in Portugal where he played for F.C. Porto.  He returned to Cape Verde and his senior career began with SC Santa Maria based in his hometown.  He would play for several Portuguese football clubs starting with FC Porto for one season in 2009, two seasons with Gil Vicente and was on loan with Pinhalnovense in the 2011-12 season and recently with Famalicão.  He spent one season in Romania with ACS Poli Timişoara where he appeared for nine matches and scored a goal.  Rodi moved to play with Sporting Praia, his second Cape Verdean club in six years where he currently appears.

Rodi was capped for Cape Verde under-21 team. He was call-up to the senior team in September 2009 along with 3 other U21 internationals and played in the match against Malta.

References

External links

1988 births
Living people
Cape Verdean footballers
Cape Verde international footballers
Cape Verdean expatriate footballers
SC Santa Maria players
FC Porto players
Gil Vicente F.C. players
F.C. Famalicão players
ACS Poli Timișoara players
Sporting Clube da Praia players
Santiago South Premier Division players
Association football forwards
Expatriate footballers in Portugal
Expatriate footballers in Romania
People from Sal, Cape Verde
Cape Verde under-21 international footballers
C.D. Pinhalnovense players